Lian River is a river in southeast China that flows into the South China Sea. It is one of the most polluted rivers in China.

See also
Guiyu Town

Rivers of Guangdong